{{DISPLAYTITLE:Sigma2 Cancri}}

Sigma2 Cancri, Latinized from σ2 Cancri, is the Bayer designation for a solitary, white-hued star in the constellation Cancer. It is faintly visible to the naked eye, with an apparent visual magnitude of +5.44. Based upon an annual parallax shift of 16.79 mas as seen from Earth, this star is located around 194 light years from the Sun.

With an estimated age of 441 million years, this is an A-type subgiant star with a stellar classification of A7 IV. It is spinning relatively rapidly with a projected rotational velocity of 133 K. The star has an estimated 1.8 times the mass of the Sun and is radiating 21.5 times the Sun's luminosity from its photosphere at an effective temperature of roughly 8,309 K.

References

A-type subgiants
Cancri, Sigma2
Cancer (constellation)
Durchmusterung objects
Cancri, 59
076398
043932
3555